These are the official results of the Women's Heptathlon competition at the 1982 European Championships in Athens, Greece, held at Olympic Stadium "Spiros Louis" on 9 and 10 September 1982.

Medalists

Results

Final
9/10 September

Participation
According to an unofficial count, 17 athletes from 13 countries participated in the event.

 (1)
 (3)
 (1)
 (1)
 (1)
 (1)
 (1)
 (1)
 (2)
 (2)
 (1)
 (1)
 (1)

See also
 1978 Women's European Championships Pentathlon (Prague)
 1980 Women's Olympic Pentathlon (Moscow)
 1983 Women's World Championships Heptathlon (Helsinki)
 1984 Women's Olympic Heptathlon (Los Angeles)
 1986 Women's European Championships Heptathlon (Stuttgart)
 1987 Women's World Championships Heptathlon (Rome)
 1988 Women's Olympic Heptathlon (Seoul)

References

 Results

Heptathlon
Combined events at the European Athletics Championships
1982 in women's athletics